Žilče is a village in the municipality of Jegunovce, North Macedonia.

Demographics
According to the 2002 census, the village had a total of 650 inhabitants. Ethnic groups in the village include:

Macedonians 642
Serbs 5
Others 3

References

Villages in Jegunovce Municipality